The United States Secretary of the Navy's Research Chair in Naval History was established in 1987 by the then Naval Historical Center, Department of the Navy (now known as the Naval History & Heritage Command).  This competitive appointment was designed to support, for up to three years, a scholar in researching and writing a major monograph on the history of the U.S. Navy since 1945.

Past holders of this chair include:

1987–1988  Dr. Malcolm "Kip" Muir
1988–1989
1989–1990  Dr. William N. Still, Jr.
1990–1991  Dr. Christopher McKee
1991–1992  Dr. James Recknor
2003  John C. Reilly Jr.

References

External links
 Naval History and Heritage Command official website

+
+
Naval History and Heritage Command